The Ferrari 250 S was a sports racing car produced by Ferrari in 1952. It was the first in the long lineage of Ferrari 250 road and race cars powered by a ubiquitous 3.0-litre Colombo V12 engine. In 1952 the 250 S won the Mille Miglia and 12 Hours of Pescara. At the Le Mans, the same year, it clocked the fastest race lap time. Only a single example was produced.

Development
The 250 S was created as an evolution over the preceding 225 S model. It shared the same tubular steel chassis of a Tuboscocca type as some of them. The new model retained the same wheelbase and track dimensions. New was the 3.0-litre Colombo V12 engine, developed by Aurelio Lampredi as a chief Ferrari engineer at that time.

The 250 S had a closed berlinetta bodywork designed by Giovanni Michelotti and carried out by Vignale. The style closely resembled the Vignale berlinettas of its predecessors. Front fenders had two portholes in them and the fuel filler cap was on the outside, mounted on the rear window. After the Mile Miglia, bonnet was modified with an air-scoop. Front windshield had three small wipers installed, one of them was on the roof.

A single example was ever produced, s/n 0156ET. "ET" in its suffix represented 'Export-Tuboscocca'. The technical experience and racing capabilities of the 250 S over its career led Ferrari to develop a series produced race car, the 250 MM.

Specifications

Engine and transmission
A compression ratio of 9:1 was higher than before. An SOHC and two valve configuration was standard for Ferrari V12 at that time. Also unchanged were the three Weber 36DCF carburettors. The engine used a single spark plug per cylinder, served by two coils and had a wet sump lubrication. The 250 S still used a five-speed non-synchronised gearbox. Clutch was of a single-plate type.

Chassis and suspension
The chassis of the 250 S was one of the Tuboscocca type that used a smaller diameter steel tubes with additional cross members. The resulting trellis space frame was slightly lighter and more rigid than the standard tubular chassis. It was developed by Gilco, a chassis specialist company established by Gilberto Colombo, and first introduced on a late 212 Export. The front suspension was independent with unequal-length wishbones and transverse leaf springs, aided by hydraulic shock absorbers. At the rear was a live axle with semi-elliptical springs and hydraulic shock absorbers. Brakes were of a drum type.

Racing

The 250 S had its first outing at the 1952 Mille Miglia. Entered by Scuderia Ferrari, the car was driven by Giovanni Bracco and Alfonso Rolfo. After a magnificent performance on the Futa and Raticosa passes, they managed to finish first overall, continuing Ferrari's dominance in this road marathon.

Alberto Ascari and Luigi Villoresi were chosen by Scuderia Ferrari to compete in the 1952 24 Hours of Le Mans in the 'Sport 3.0' category. The 250 S, driven by Ascari, recorded the fastest race lap at 4min 40.5sec at an average speed of 173.16 km/h. The car retired with a broken clutch.

At the 1952 Circuito di Senigallia race, the 250 S was entered in the 'Sport +2.0' class. Luigi Villoresi managed a third place overall. Later the same year, at the Coppa Acerbo for sports cars, renamed as the 12 Hours of Pescara, yielded another success for Ferrari. Giovanni Bracco and Paolo Marzotto won the race in the 250 S. The 1952 Carrera Panamericana race was contested by Giovanni Bracco and Gino Bronzoni duo. Their car did not finish the grueling marathon due to clutch and engine problems. Still in 1953, at the Giro di Sicilia, Franco Cornacchia and Gino Bronzoni finished the race prematurely with a broken differential.

In 1953 the 250 S was acquired by an Argentinian Roberto Bonomi. Later the same year, he had entered it in the Targa Florio race. He finished eighth overall and, because of the popular 'S+750' category, eighth in class also. The car competed in the GP Monza, entered by Scuderia Guastalla, finishing at an eighth place. Later, Bonomi entered the Coppa d'Oro delle Dolomiti race but to no avail. The last race of the 250 S was the 1954 Supercortemaggiore at Monza. Entered by Scuderia Guastella and driven by Musitelli and Pezzoli the car did not finish the race.

See also
 Ferrari 250

References

Bibliography

External links

250 S
Sports racing cars
Mille Miglia
24 Hours of Le Mans race cars